Mukaa is a village and location in Makueni County, Kenya. The community is a tight and small one, and they are generally peaceful. Mukaa was founded in the late 19th century by AIM (Africa Inland Mission, Later Africa Inland Church) Missionaries. They built a church.

Institutions
 Mukaa A.I.C Church (Founded 1888)
 Mukaa Primary School
 A.I.C Mukaa Children's Home
 Mukaa Boys High School
 Salama Baptist Church
 Salama Kenya Baptist Children's Home

Makueni County
Populated places in Eastern Province (Kenya)